Beautiful Pain is a 2016 Malaysian drama film directed by Tunku Mona Riza. It was selected as the Malaysian entry for the Best Foreign Language Film at the 89th Academy Awards but it was not nominated.

Cast
 Harith Haziq as Danial
 Remy Ishak as Azim
 June Lojong as Alina
 Namron as Razlan
 Nadiya Nissa as Shasha
 Zahiril Adzim as Faizal
 Ruminah Sidek as Mak Jah
 Izzy Reef as Teen Daniel
 Susan Lankester as Katrina
 Angeline Tan as Pek Yoke
 Susan Manen as Waty
 Anne Abdullah as Norain
 Marissa Yasmin as Soraya
 Kismah Johar as Mak Faizal
 Tania Zainal as Doctor
 Nurul Azia binti Azmi as Siti
 Abdul Mubin bin Ismail as Asang

See also
 List of submissions to the 89th Academy Awards for Best Foreign Language Film
 List of Malaysian submissions for the Academy Award for Best Foreign Language Film

References

External links
 

2016 films
2016 drama films
Malaysian drama films
Malay-language films